Shanghai University of Sport (上海体育学院; Shànghǎi tǐyù xuéyuàn) is a public university in Yangpu District, Shanghai, China. Founded in 1952, it is the first university of its kind in the People's Republic of China. It is a Chinese state Double First Class University, included in the Double First Class University Plan identified by the Ministry of Education. 

Shanghai University of Sport consistently ranks the best in China among universities specialized on sport in the recognized Best Chinese Universities Ranking. As of 2022, Shanghai University of Sport ranks #1 in Asia and #43 in the world according to "Global Ranking of Sport Science Schools and Departments 2022" released by Shanghai Ranking.

History
SUS was established in November 1952 by the merger of departments of Physical Education from East China Normal University, Nanjing University and Ginling College. Wu Yunrui, the first president of SUS, devoted himself to the advanced values and notions of physical education.

SUS was formerly under the direct governance of the General Administration of Sport of China and began to be jointly constructed and managed in 2001 by the General Administration of Sport of China and Shanghai Municipal Government.

Academics
In over 60 years of construction and development, SUS has grown into a multi-disciplined university with six categories of education: management, science, literature, medicine and arts featured with sport science. SUS has established a complete education system covering bachelor, master and doctoral programs and set up a mobile station for post-doctoral research in sport science. 

SUS has more than 4000 full-time undergraduate students on campus, 1000 postgraduate students, 1400 overseas students, 1400 adult students, and more than 700 teaching and administration staff, among whom 82 are professors and 170 associate professors.

References

External links 
English website
International Exchange
Chinese website
Site at Sina Weibo

Universities and colleges in Shanghai
Sport in Shanghai
Sports universities and colleges in China